Behala Paschim Assembly constituency is a Legislative Assembly constituency of South 24 Parganas district in the Indian state of West Bengal.

Overview
As per orders of the Delimitation Commission, No. 154 Behala Paschim Assembly constituency is composed of the following: 118, 119, 125, 126, 127, 128, 129, 130, 131 and 132 of Kolkata Municipal  Corporation.

Behala Paschim Assembly constituency is part of No. 23 Kolkata Dakshin (Lok Sabha constituency). Behala West was earlier part of Jadavpur (Lok Sabha constituency).

Members of Legislative Assembly

Election results

2021
In the 2021 elections, Partha Chatterjee of Trinamool Congress, defeated his nearest rival, Srabanti Chatterjee of BJP

2016
In the 2016 elections, Partha Chatterjee of Trinamool Congress defeated his nearest rival Kaustav Chatterjee of CPI(M).

 

.# Swing calculated on LF+Congress vote percentages taken together in 2016.

2011
In the 2011 elections, Partha Chatterjee of Trinamool Congress defeated his nearest rival Anupam Deb Sarkar of CPI(M).

 

 

.# Swing calculated on Congress+Trinamool Congress vote percentages taken together in 2006.

2006
In the 2006 elections, Partha Chatterjee of Trinamool Congress defeated his nearest rival Niranjan Chatterjee of CPI(M).

 

.# Swing calculated on BJP+Trinamool Congress vote percentages taken together in 2006.

1952-1972
Biswanath Chakraborty of CPI won in 1972. Rabin Mukherjee of CPI(M) won in 1971, 1969 and 1967. Prior to that Behala was a single seat. Rabindra Nath Mukhopadhyay of CPI won the Behala seat  in 1962 and 1957. In independent India's first election in 1952, Biren Roy of Forward Bloc (RG) won the Behala seat.

1977-2006
In the 2006 and 2001 Partha Chatterjee of Trinamool Congress won the Behala West assembly constituency defeating his nearest rivals Niranjan Mukherjee of CPI(M) in 2006 and Nirmal Mukherjee of CPI(M) in 2001. Contests in most years were multi cornered but only winners and runners are being mentioned. Nirmal Mukherjee of CPI(M) defeated Kumud Bhattacharya of Congress in 1996, and Lakshmi Kanta Basu of Congress in 1991. Rabin Mukherjee of CPI(M) defeated Lakshmi Kanta Basu of Congress in 1987, Aruna Ghosh Dastidar of Congress in 1982 and Subodh Chandra Das of Congress in 1977.

References

Notes

Citations

Assembly constituencies of West Bengal
Politics of South 24 Parganas district